The Euphrates spring minnow (Pseudophoxinus firati) is a species of freshwater fish in the family Cyprinidae. It is found in the Euphrates drainage in Turkey.

References

Pseudophoxinus
Endemic fauna of Turkey
Fish described in 2006